Jan-Christian Schröder (born 31 January 1998) is a German chess grandmaster.

Chess career
Born in 1998, Schröder earned his international master title in 2014 and his grandmaster title in 2015.

References

External links

Living people
1998 births
Chess grandmasters
German chess players
People from Limburg an der Lahn
Sportspeople from Giessen (region)